A photo finish is a photo or video taken at the finish line of a sporting race when multiple competitors cross the finishing line at nearly the same time.

Photo finish may also refer to:

Photo-Finish, the seventh studio album by Irish musician Rory Gallagher
Photo Finish (novel), a detective novel by Ngaio Marsh
Photo Finish (film), a 1965 Australian film
Photo Finish Records, an independent record label located in New York City, United States
Photo Finish (Prison Break episode), an episode of Prison Break, an American serial drama television series
Photo Finish (My Little Pony), a character of the My Little Pony franchise
Photo Finish (play), a play by Peter Ustinov
Photo finishing, the chemical means by which photographic film and paper are treated after photographic exposure to produce a negative or positive image
"Photo Finish", an episode of Dexter's Laboratory